"I Want to Spend My Lifetime Loving You" is a 1998 song written by James Horner and lyricist Will Jennings for the 1998 film The Mask of Zorro, of which it is the main theme. For the film, the song was recorded by American singer Marc Anthony and Australian singer Tina Arena. Released as a single in Europe, the duet reached number three in France, number four in the Netherlands, number nine in Wallonia, and number 34 in Switzerland.

At the 1999 ALMA Awards, it won Outstanding Performance of a Song for a Feature Film.

Critical reception
Larry Flick from Billboard wrote, "James Horner and Will Jennings, the writing team behind Celine Dion's "My Heart Will Go On", try to make a little more cinematic pop magic with the theme to "The Mask Of Zorro". Will it meet with similarly manic consumer response? Probably not. But it's a fine showcase for the lovely voices of Anthony and Arena (the latter is practically channeling Dion in her performance). The song has a grand Spanish flavor that suits the tone of the film. Expect AC programmers to jump on this one, while top 40 tastemakers hang back and wait to see how the movie does at the box office."

Music video
A music video for the song was released in 1998, directed by British director Nigel Dick. It features Tina Arena and Marc Anthony singing on a stage in front of an audience, with footage from the film playing out on a projector screen.

Track listing
European CD single
 "I Want to Spend My Lifetime Loving You" – 4:41
 "Zorro's Theme" (The London Symphony Orchestra) – 3:01
 "Not for Sale" – 3:55
 "Any Other Love" – 4:39

Charts and certifications

Weekly charts

Year-end charts

Certifications

References

1998 singles
1998 songs
Columbia Records singles
Love themes
Male–female vocal duets
Marc Anthony songs
Song recordings produced by Jim Steinman
Songs with lyrics by Will Jennings
Songs written by James Horner
Songs written for films
Sony Music singles
Tina Arena songs
Song recordings with Wall of Sound arrangements